Heliosia novirufa is a moth of the subfamily Arctiinae. It was described by Cheng-Lai Fang in 1992. It is found in Zhejiang, China.

References

Nudariina
Moths described in 1992